Peter Sichrovsky (born 5 September 1947) is an Austrian journalist, writer, former politician and Member of the European Parliament. He belonged to the Freedom Party of Austria during his two terms in the European Parliament, although he was officially non-attached.

Early life 
Peter Sichrovsky was born and raised in Vienna, Austria. From 1963 to 1968, Sichrovsky studied at the Higher Technical School of Biochemistry in Vienna, graduating from there to study pharmacy and chemistry at the University of Vienna from 1970 to 1975. After receiving his university qualifications, Sichrovsky became a high school chemistry and physics teacher, leaving education in 1976 to take up management positions in various pharmaceutical companies. From 1980, Sichrovsky found employment as a journalist in a variety of newspapers, including Der Spiegel, Männer Vogue, and Der Standard, which he co-founded in 1988. After positions in Europe, Sichrovsky travelled abroad to New Delhi and Hong Kong to become a foreign correspondent there. During the 1990s, he continued his trips abroad through Hong Kong, Vienna, Chicago and Los Angeles.

Political career 
On 11 November 1996, Sichrovsky was elected to the European Parliament as a representative of his home country. Although he was a parliamentary member of the Freedom Party of Austria, he was considered non-attached as his party did not have the required number of seats in the European Parliament to form a political group. Sichrovsky served on several committees during his two terms in the European Parliament, including the Committee on External Economic Relations, the Subcommittee on Security and Disarmament, the Committee on Culture, Youth, Education, the Media and Sport and the Delegation to the EU-Kazakhstan, EU-Kyrgyzstan and EU-Uzbekistan Parliamentary Cooperation Committees and Delegation for relations with Tadjikistan, Turkmenistan and Mongolia. From 2000 to 2002 Sichrovsky was the general secretary of the Freedom Party of Austria.

Sichrovsky is a controversial figure inside the conservative right. Some opine that because of his Jewish origin he was supposed to help the Haider's party make peace with Jews.

Other works
Sichrovsky has written fifteen books, including four children's books, plays, and screenplays. In 1986, an English translation of Sichrovsky's book Wir wissen nicht was morgen wird, wir wissen wohl was gestern war: Junge Juden in Deutschland und Österreich, a collection of interviews with the children of Jewish holocaust victims and survivors, was published as Strangers in their own land: Young Jews in Germany and Austria today. Two years later, in 1988, an English translation of Schuldig geboren: Kinder aus Nazifamilien, a collection of interviews with children of Nazi parents, was published as Born Guilty: Children of Nazi Families.

References 

1947 births
Austrian male writers
Living people
Freedom Party of Austria politicians
Writers from Vienna
University of Vienna alumni
Freedom Party of Austria MEPs
MEPs for Austria 1996–1999
MEPs for Austria 1999–2004
21st-century Austrian politicians
Austrian Jews